The 2012 San Diego Toreros football team represented the University of San Diego in the 2012 NCAA Division I FCS football season. They were led by sixth-year head coach Ron Caragher and played their home games at Torero Stadium. They were a member of the Pioneer Football League. They finished the season 8–3, 7–1 in PFL play to win their second consecutive league championship, shared with Butler and Drake. Head Coach Ron Caragher resigned at the end of the season to take the same position at San Jose State. On December 28, defensive coordinator Dale Lindsey was named the new head coach beginning in 2013.

Schedule

November 3's game against Marist was postponed due to effects from Hurricane Sandy. The Game was rescheduled to December 1.

References

San Diego
San Diego Toreros football seasons
Pioneer Football League champion seasons
San Diego Toreros football